Ione is an unincorporated community in Weld County, Colorado.

History
A post office called Ione was established in 1927, and remained in operation until 1958. Tradition states the name "Ione" is a phonetic spelling of "I own (it)", a favorite saying of the original owner of the town site, W. A. Davis.

References

Unincorporated communities in Weld County, Colorado
Unincorporated communities in Colorado